= Egypt–Guatemala relations =

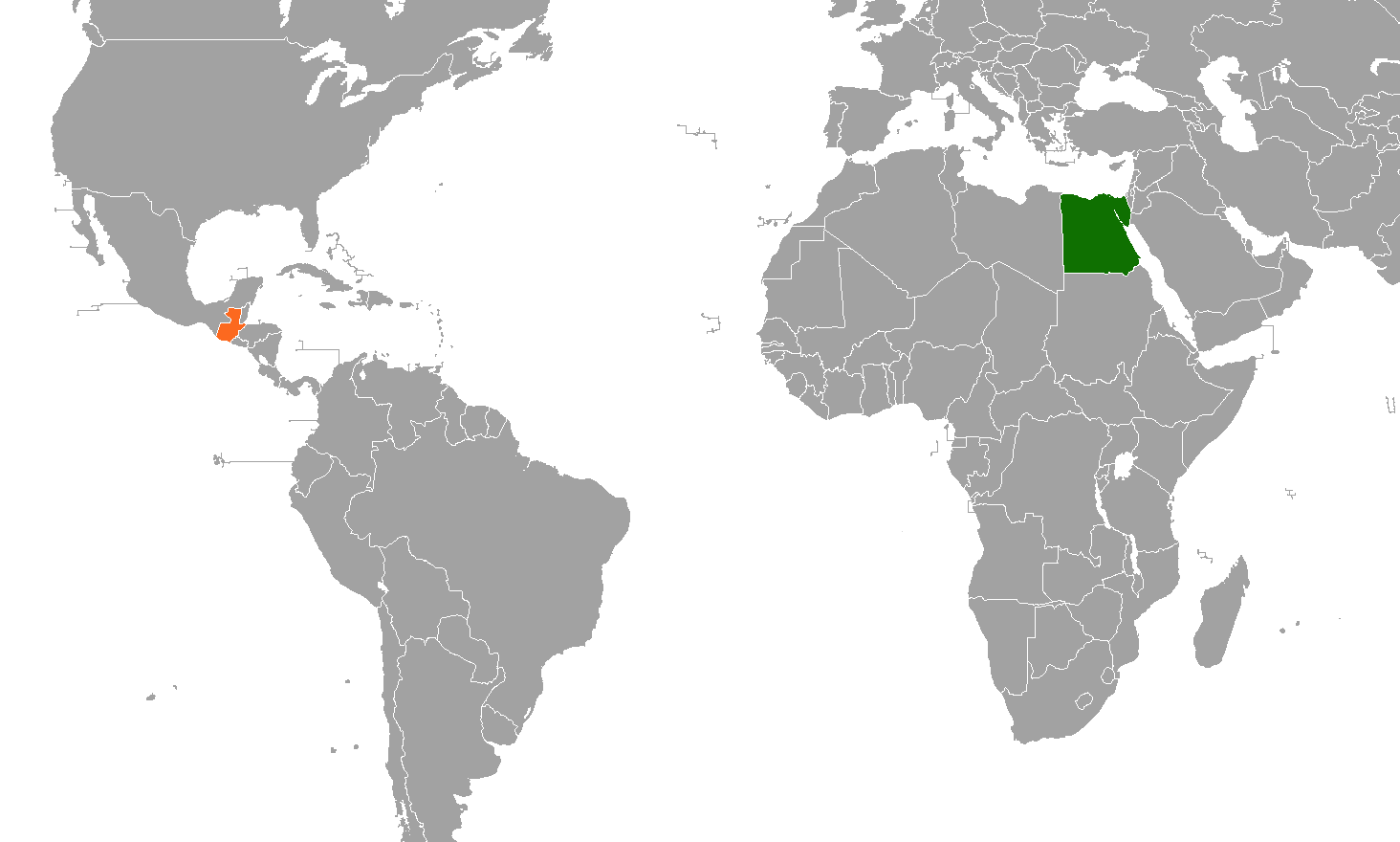
- Egypt: Guatemala

Egypt–Guatemala relations are the bilateral relations between Egypt and Guatemala. The two countries established diplomatic relations with each other on September 9 1970. Both countries are members of Group of 77 and Non-Aligned Movement.

== History ==
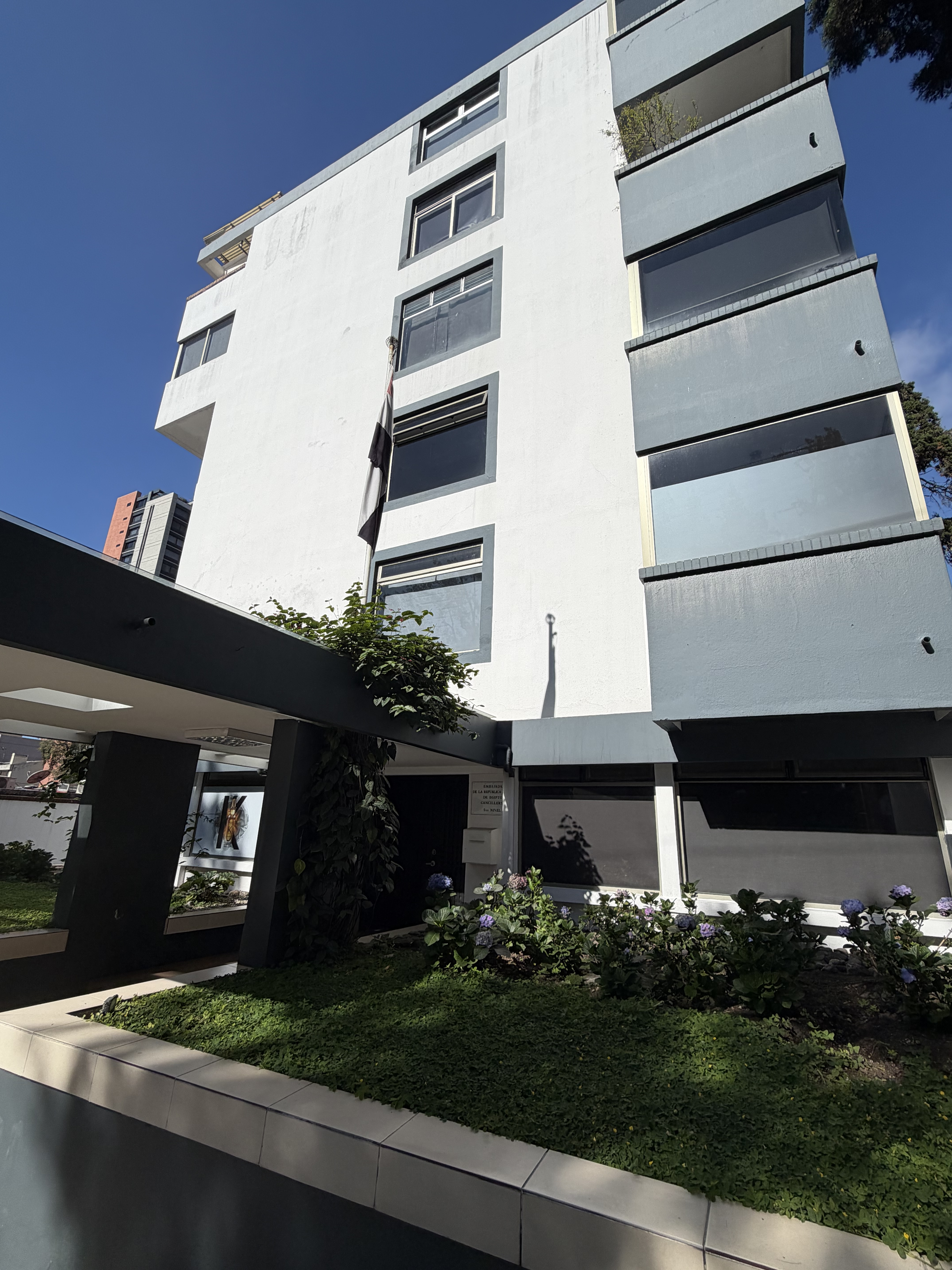
Embassy of Egypt in Guatemala City

Guatemala and Egypt have signed two agreements that remain in force: the Agreement on Cultural, Technical and Scientific Cooperation between the Government of the Republic of Guatemala and the Government of the Arab Republic of Egypt, signed in Guatemala City on August 2, 1981, and the Executive Program for Cultural, Technical and Scientific Cooperation between the Republic of Guatemala and the Arab Republic of Egypt for the years 2006-2008, signed in Guatemala City on January 11, 2006.

Guatemala has maintained a very strong dialogue with Egypt in recent years.

== Trade ==
The main export product from Guatemala is cardamom, representing 95% of total exports to Egypt. Imports are shown in relation to the fact that the main product to be imported is plastic materials and manufactures, representing 47%, followed by paper and cardboard with 26% of total imports, clothing items account for 12%, followed by pharmaceutical products at 9%.

== Resident diplomatic missions ==
- Guatemala has an embassy in Cairo.
- Egypt has an embassy in Guatemala City.
